Albert Schofield  (1 September 1890 – 12 August 1969) was an Australian rules footballer who played for the Geelong Football Club in the Victorian Football League (VFL).

In 1959 he was appointed as a Member of the Order of the British Empire (MBE) by Elizabeth II for his service as manager of the Returned Soldier's Woollen Mills.

Notes

External links 

1890 births
1969 deaths
Australian rules footballers from Victoria (Australia)
Geelong Football Club players